The 29th Moscow International Film Festival was held from 21 to 30 June 2007. The Golden George was awarded to the Russian film Travelling with Pets directed by Vera Storozheva.

Jury
 Fred Schepisi (Australia – Chairman of the Jury)
 Anna Galiena (Italy)
 Dito Tsintsadze (Georgia)
 Ildikó Enyedi (Hungary)
 Othman Karim (Sweden)
 Renata Litvinova (Russia)
 Fred Roos (United States)

Films in competition
The following films were selected for the main competition:

Awards
 Golden George: Travelling with Pets by Vera Storozheva
 Special Jury Prize: Silver George: The Russian Triangle by Aleko Tsabadze
 Silver George:
 Best Director: Giuseppe Tornatore for The Unknown Woman
 Best Actor: Fabrice Luchini for Molière
 Best Actress: Kirsti Stubø for Opium: Diary of a Madwoman
 Silver George for the best film of the Perspective competition: Monotony by Juris Poskus
 Lifetime Achievement Award: Aleksey Batalov, Tatiana Samoilova
 Stanislavsky Award: Daniel Olbrychski

References

External links
Moscow International Film Festival: 2007 at Internet Movie Database

2007
2007 film festivals
2007 festivals in Europe
Mos
2007 in Moscow
June 2007 events in Russia